Baseball at the 2018 Asian Games was held in Jakarta, Indonesia from 21 August to 1 September 2018. A total of ten teams, the most ever, competed in the competition at two competition venues in Jakarta: Gelora Bung Karno Baseball Field and Rawamangun Baseball Field. The baseball teams of Laos, Sri Lanka and hosts Indonesia made their Asian Games baseball debut. The top six ranked teams, along with the hosts Indonesia (ranked eighth), advanced to the main draw. The bottom three teams competed, with the winner advancing to the main draw.

Schedule

Medalists

Draw
The top seven ranked teams advanced to the main draw. The bottom three teams competed in round 1, with the winner advancing to the main draw. The teams were distributed according to their position at the WBSC World Rankings.

Group A

Round 1

Group B

Round 1

Squads

Results
All times are Western Indonesia Time (UTC+07:00)

Round 1

Preliminary

Group A

Group B

Consolation round
 The results of the matches between the same teams that were already played during the preliminary round shall be taken into account for the consolation round.

Super round
 The results of the matches between the same teams that were already played during the preliminary round shall be taken into account for the super round.

Final round

Bronze medal match

Gold medal match

Final standing

References

External links
Baseball at the 2018 Asian Games
Official Result Book – Baseball

 
2018
2018 Asian Games
2018 Asian Games events
Asian Games